The 2018–19 UEFA Women's Champions League qualifying round was played between 7 and 13 August 2018. A total of 40 teams competed in the qualifying round to decide 12 of the 32 places in the knockout phase of the 2018–19 UEFA Women's Champions League.

Draw

The draw of the qualifying round was held at the UEFA headquarters in Nyon, Switzerland on 22 June 2018, 13:30 CEST. The teams were allocated into four seeding positions based on their UEFA club coefficients at the beginning of the season. They were drawn into groups of four containing one team from each of the four seeding positions. First, the teams which were pre-selected as hosts were drawn from their own designated pot and allocated to their respective group as per their seeding positions. Next, the remaining teams were drawn from their respective pot which were allocated according to their seeding positions.

Based on the decision taken by the UEFA Emergency Panel at its meeting in Paris on 9 June 2016, teams from Serbia or Bosnia and Herzegovina would not be drawn against teams from Kosovo.

Below are the 40 teams which participate in the qualifying round (with their 2018 UEFA club coefficients, which take into account their performance in European competitions from 2013–14 to 2017–18 plus 33% of their association coefficient from the same time span), with the ten teams which are pre-selected as hosts marked by (H).

Format

In each group, teams played against each other in a round-robin mini-tournament at the pre-selected hosts. The group winners and the two runners-up with the best record against the teams finishing first and third in their group advanced to the round of 32 to join the 20 teams which received a bye.

Tiebreakers

Teams are ranked according to points (3 points for a win, 1 point for a draw, 0 points for a loss), and if tied on points, the following tiebreaking criteria are applied, in the order given, to determine the rankings (Regulations Articles 14.01 and 14.02):
Points in head-to-head matches among tied teams;
Goal difference in head-to-head matches among tied teams;
Goals scored in head-to-head matches among tied teams;
If more than two teams are tied, and after applying all head-to-head criteria above, a subset of teams are still tied, all head-to-head criteria above are reapplied exclusively to this subset of teams;
Goal difference in all group matches;
Goals scored in all group matches;
Penalty shoot-out if only two teams have the same number of points, and they met in the last round of the group and are tied after applying all criteria above (not used if more than two teams have the same number of points, or if their rankings are not relevant for qualification for the next stage);
Disciplinary points (red card = 3 points, yellow card = 1 point, expulsion for two yellow cards in one match = 3 points);
UEFA club coefficient.

To determine the best runners-up, the results against the teams in fourth place are discarded. The following criteria are applied (Regulations Article 14.03):
Points;
Goal difference;
Goals scored;
Disciplinary points;
UEFA club coefficient.

Groups

The matches were played on 7, 10 and 13 August 2018. The schedule of each group was as follows, with two rest days between each matchday (Regulations Article 19.05):

Times are CEST (UTC+2), as listed by UEFA (local times, if different, are in parentheses).

Group 1

Group 2

Group 3

Group 4

Group 5

Group 6

Group 7

Group 8

Group 9

Group 10

Ranking of second-placed teams
To determine the two best second-placed teams from the qualifying round which advance to the knockout phase, only the results of the second-placed teams against the first and third-placed teams in their group were taken into account, while results against the fourth-placed team were not included. As a result, two matches played by each second-placed team counted for the purposes of determining the ranking.

References

External links

1
August 2018 sports events in Europe